Star Wars: X-wing is a ten-book series of Star Wars novels by Michael A. Stackpole (who also co-wrote the similarly named comic book series) and Aaron Allston. Stackpole's contributions cover the adventures of a new Rogue Squadron formed by Wedge Antilles, while Allston's focus on Antilles' Wraith Squadron.

Background 
While preparing to write the series, Stackpole contacted Star Wars Expanded Universe author Timothy Zahn, whose Thrawn trilogy also features a group called Rogue Squadron. After the first book came out, Stackpole asked Zahn for permission to use his character Talon Karrde; Zahn changed about three words of dialogue. Later, Zahn asked Stackpole if he could use Booster Terrik in the first book of his Hand of Thrawn duology; Stackpole returned the favor of changing three words.

Plot synopses
While the first eight books are largely continuous, the first four form a complete story arc (being continuous works by Stackpole), and the next three form another complete arc (being continuous works of Allston). Isard's Revenge mostly refers back to characters and situations created in Stackpole's first four novels. Starfighters of Adumar focuses on a few major characters (including, several officers from Rogue Squadron, namely: Antilles, Tycho Celchu, Wes Janson, and Hobbie Klivian).

The first seven novels take place 6.5–7.5 years after the events of the original Star Wars film. Isard's Revenge takes place about two years later, and Starfighters of Adumar takes place 3–4 years after that.

Rogue Squadron (1996)
Rogue Squadron (1996) is the first novel in the Star Wars: X-wing series. It is set at the beginning of the New Republic era of the Star Wars Expanded Universe and centers on the creation of a new Rogue Squadron by legendary Rebel Alliance pilot Wedge Antilles. As the first novel in the series, it introduces the primary character, Corran Horn, as well as a host of other characters, including Mirax Terrik, Erisi Dlarit, and Tycho Celchu. The novel focuses on the training and early development of the squadron, as well as the characters and their relationships (primarily Erisi's romantic interest in Corran, and Mirax and Corran's mutual romantic interest). The novel culminates in a daring attack on the Imperial stronghold of Borleias, the first step in an invasion of the capital world Coruscant.

Wedge's Gamble (1996)
Wedge's Gamble (1996) is the second novel in the series. It is set at the beginning of the New Republic era of the Star Wars Expanded Universe. Following the conquest of Borleias, the Rebels and Rogue Squadron must handle Imperial espionage ordered by the rogue imperial Warlord Zsinj. The apparent death of member Bror Jace, the subsequent recruiting by the squadron introduces new, hot-shot members, Aril Nunb and Pash Cracken. With worries of attacks by Zsinj's forces, the Provisional Council convenes and decide that the invasion of Coruscant (capital of the old republic and currently imperial center) must proceed. A decision is handed down that criminals from the Black Sun, a criminal organization, who have been imprisoned in the Spice Mines of Kessel, would be released on Coruscant as saboteurs and to weaken resistance against for the coming invasion, the Rogues are first sent to Kessel. Rogue Squadron must use their undercover skills to help the Alliance to take Coruscant. The Squadron uses the orbital mirrors to reflect sunlight onto the reservoirs of Coruscant, disabling the planetary shields, and allowing the Alliance fleet a fighting chance at taking the planet.

The Krytos Trap (1996)
The Krytos Trap (1996) is the third novel in the series. It is set at the beginning of the New Republic era in the Star Wars universe and focuses on the problems the New Republic has in occupying Coruscant. The plot focuses on three key events. The first is the occupation of Coruscant and the trouble the Empire left behind with its crippling bio-attack on the planet. The virus used in the attack being the Krytos virus, ordered by Imperial leader Ysanne Isard and developed by General Evir Derricote. Humans are apparently immune, while all other species are vulnerable. This, combined with Imperial Intelligence officer Kirtan Loor's terrorist activities while taking orders from the Palpatine Counterinsurgency Front, leaves Coruscant and the New Republic in a state of emergency.

The Bacta War (1997)
The Bacta War (1997) is the fourth installment in the series. It is set at the beginning of the New Republic era in the Star Wars universe and focuses on the conflict known as the Bacta War. While the Alliance fleet mounts a major campaign against a deadly warlord, former director of imperial intelligence, Ysanne Isard has taken control of Thyferra, intending to control production of  medicinal bacta, the only cure for the deadly krytos virus Isard has released into the population of Coruscant and of Rogue Squadron Itself. Undermanned and deprived of Alliance support, Rogue Squadron resigns and goes rogue. They must oppose Isard's plans, defeat her Star Destroyer fleet, and free Thyferra from her rule in a winner-take-all battle against a seemingly superior force.

Wraith Squadron (1998)
Wraith Squadron (1998) is the fifth book in the series. After returning to Coruscant with Rogue Squadron following the Bacta War, Wedge Antilles, with his experiences of insurgency with the Rogues during the war, decided to create a new starfighter unit which would take only pilots with commando-type skills. When pitching the idea to Admiral Ackbar, the Mon Calamari raised the issue of the cost to assemble such an elite unit. Antilles countered by saying he'd only take pilots who were on the verge of being discharged from Starfighter Command, reasoning that while many would be irredeemable, there would be a few pilots who had just made one mistake too many.

Iron Fist (1998)
Iron Fist (1998) is the sixth novel in the series. It continues the exploits of Wraith Squadron begun by Allston in Wraith Squadron. Against all odds, the controversial Wraith Squadron has survived its first covert mission. But now they are called upon to cheat death twice. This time Wedge Antilles sends them in to stop the warlord Zsinj and his Super Star Destroyer, Iron Fist. If Zsinj joins the Empire, it could turn the tide of war against the Rebels. The Wraith Squadron's mission: infiltrate the warlord's fleet and uncover his carefully guarded plans. To do so, they must pose as ruthless pirates seeking to join Zsinj's forces. And that means first becoming pirates in space lanes teeming with Imperial Navy patrols. If that isn't enough to get them killed, they'll have to pass one last test—a suicide mission for Zsinj.

Solo Command (1999)
Solo Command (1999) is the seventh novel in the series, and the final book to detail the adventures of Wraith Squadron. Their covert mission has been a success. The enemy has been vanquished. Or so they thought. The Super Star Destroyer Iron Fist somehow escaped destruction and with it the New Republic's greatest threat, the infamous warlord Zsinj. To defeat him, Wraith Squadron must join a combat task force led by the only man crafty enough to beat Zsinj at his own game: Han Solo. But Zsinj knows the X-wing pilots' indomitable courage is both their greatest strength—and their greatest weakness. For even against the most overwhelming odds, the Rebels will fight to the death. And that will leave Zsinj the galaxy's unchallenged master!

Isard's Revenge (1999)
Isard's Revenge (1999) is the eighth novel in the series. In returning to the series, Stackpole brought back a number of elements that made the original four books popular: General Wedge Antilles has returned as commander of the New Republic X-wing unit Rogue Squadron, and former Imperial leader Ysanne Isard is once again the villain. It's the kind of mission only Wedge Antilles and the Rogue Squadron would dare to undertake. Against impossible odds they will stage a daring raid into an enemy stronghold—only to be rescued from certain destruction by an unexpected ally. Ysanne Isard, the ruthless Imperial commander, has appeared on the scene seemingly from out of nowhere. Now she proposes a most unusual alliance, offering to help Wedge rescue his captured comrades from Imperial Warlord Admiral Krennel's sadistic prison camp. But her offer is not without a price. Wedge must lead Rogue Squadron in Isard's deadly struggle against an enemy made in her own image. It's an offer Wedge would love to refuse, for Isard is certain to betray them. But how can they leave their comrades at Krennel's mercy? The answer is: they can't—even if it means being caught between Krennel's ruthlessness and Isard's treachery.

Starfighters of Adumar (1999)
Starfighters of Adumar (1999) is the ninth book in the series. It was written by Allston. The neutral world of Adumar has decided to pick a side in the war to control the galaxy. Delegates from both the New Republic and the Empire have been invited to Adumar, and each camp will be given a chance to plead its government's case. But there is one small catch: since the Adumari prize military skill above all else, they insist that both delegations be composed exclusively of fighter pilots. For pilot Wedge Antilles and his company, it's an unfamiliar exercise in diplomacy—and one that's filled with unexpected peril. For once they arrive, the X-wing pilots are challenged by Adumar's fierce warriors and attacked by Imperial assassins bent on eliminating all competition. But these challenges pale in comparison to the threat posed by a rogue Republic agent... one who is determined to win Adumar's allegiance once and for all—even if it costs the X-wing pilots their lives.

Mercy Kill (2012)
At Star Wars Celebration V in 2010 a tenth novel in the series, Mercy Kill, was announced. It was written by Allston and released on August 7, 2012. It takes place over three decades after the previous volume.

References

Star Wars: X-wing
Book series introduced in 1996
X-wing series